Wang Pu may refer to:

Wang Pu (Tang dynasty) (王溥) (died 905), chief councilor of the Tang dynasty
Wang Pu (Song dynasty) (王溥) (922–982), chief councilor of the Later Zhou and Song dynasties
Wang Pu (physicist) (王普) (1902–1969), Chinese physicist